The Ven.  Algernon Langston Oldham   was  the Archdeacon of Ludlow from 1904 to 1913.

Oldham was born in Haywards Heath and  educated at  Rugby School, Trinity College Oxford and Ripon College Cuddesdon. He was Rector of St Leonard, Bridgnorth from 1883 to 1905; and also Rural Dean of Bridgnorth from 1892.
 
He died on 23 July 1916.

Notes

People from Haywards Heath
People educated at Rugby School
Alumni of Trinity College, Oxford
Archdeacons of Ludlow
Alumni of Ripon College Cuddesdon
1916 deaths